Wolleka is a village in Ethiopia, near Gondar, with a latitude and longitude of . The village is located in the Semien Gondar Zone of the Amhara Region.

Wolleka is the main centre of the Beta Israel - Ethiopian Jews. Although its population has declined, it is still known for its synagogue, its Jewish cemetery, and for pottery.
The Central Statistical Agency has not published an estimate for its 2005 population.

See also
Wolleka Synagogue

Further reading 
Shalva Weil, "Wäläqa" in Siegbert Uhlig (Editor), Encyclopaedia Aethiopica: O-X, Harrassowitz, 2010, p. 1082-1083
Jacques Faitlovitch, Quer durch Abessinien: Meine zweite Reise zu den Falaschas, Berlin, 1910

Notes 

Beta Israel
Historic Jewish communities in Ethiopia
Populated places in the Amhara Region